Labeobarbus upembensis is a species of ray-finned fish in the genus Labeobarbus is endemic to the Kalumengonga River in the Democratic Republic of the Congo.

References 

upembensis
Taxa named by Keith Edward Banister
Taxa named by Roland G. Bailey
Fish described in 1979
Endemic fauna of the Democratic Republic of the Congo